The 2011 Football Federation South Australia season was the 103rd season of soccer in South Australia, and the fourth under the FFSA format.

2009 FFSA Super League

The 2009 South Australian Super League (also known as the Devine Homes Super League for sponsorship reasons) was the fourth edition of the South Australian Super League, the top level domestic association football competition in South Australia, and was the second season to use the McIntyre Final Five finals system introduced the previous year. Ten teams competed, with the two worst finishing being relegated to the 2010 Premier League. The league was won by the North Eastern MetroStars after they beat Adelaide City 1–0 in the Grand Final, becoming just the second team (apart from Adelaide City) to finish top of the league or win the Grand Final.

League table

Finals

2009 FFSA Premier League

The 2009 FFSA Premier League was the fourth edition of the FFSA Premier League as the second level domestic association football competition in South Australia. 10 teams competed, all playing each other twice for a total of 18 rounds, with the top five at the end of the year qualifying for the McIntyre final five finals system to determine 1st to 5th place. The League winners (The Cobras) and Grand Final winners (Cumberland) were promoted to the 2010 FFSA Super League, and the last placed team (South Adelaide) were relegated to the 2010 FFSA State League. At the end of the season, the S.A.S.I. withdrew from the official competitions to participate in the Super League Reserves.

League table

Finals

2009 FFSA State League

The 2009 FFSA State League was the fourth edition of the FFSA State League as the third level domestic association football competition in South Australia. 11 teams competed, all playing each other twice for a total of 20 rounds, with the top five at the end of the year qualifying for the McIntyre final five finals system to determine 1st to 5th place. The League winners and Grand Final winners were promoted to the 2010 FFSA Premier League.

League table

Finals

See also
2009 FFSA Premier League
2009 FFSA Super League
2009 FFSA State League
National Premier Leagues South Australia
Football Federation South Australia

References

2011 in Australian soccer
Football South Australia seasons